Kuraoka Shrine is a Shinto shrine in Seika, Kyoto built in 1008 to deity Michizane Sugawara. There are 150+ steps after the entrance to Kuraoka Shrine which leads to the main complex of the shrine.

Reference books 
 鞍岡神社　略記
 精華町史本文篇

Links 
 Kuraoka Shrine

Shinto shrines in Kyoto